Robert Harley is a British comedy writer and actor, best known for his work in the sketch show Smack the Pony and the sitcom Green Wing, where he also plays Charles, the CEO of East Hampton Hospital Trust. He has written (with James Henry) The Delivery Man for ITV1. He is the co-founder of independent production company Monicker Pictures.

Filmography

Performer 
Fast Forward - (1984)
Paul Merton: The Series - (1991–93)
The Preventers - (1996) - Craig Sturdy
Green Wing - (2004 - 2007) - Charles
Peep Show - (2003) - Barry

Writer 
The Preventers - (1996)
Los Dos Bros - (1999-2001)
Smack the Pony - (1999-2003)
Green Wing - (2004 - 2007)
Campus (2009 - 2011)The Delivery Man'' - (2015 - )

References

External links 
Robert Harley in BBC Comedy Guide
Green Wing "microsite" at Channel4.com
British Sitcom Guide Green Wing writers

21st-century British screenwriters
21st-century British male writers
British television writers
British male screenwriters
British comedy writers
English male television actors
Living people
Year of birth missing (living people)